Matthias Lilienthal (born 21 December 1959) is a German dramaturge and theatre director.

Life and work 
Born in Berlin, Lilienthal grew up as the second of three children in Berlin-Neukölln. After graduating from the Berlin Evangelisches Gymnasium zum Grauen Kloster (1978), he studied history, German studies and theatre studies at the Free University of Berlin, but dropped out after ten years.

Mid-1980s - 2002 
From 1988 to 1991, under artistic director Frank Baumbauer dramaturge at the Theater Basel, where he worked with the then unknown Christoph Marthaler and tried to convince Baumbauer to bring Frank Castorf to Basel. When Castorf made him an offer, Lilienthal moved to the Volksbühne Berlin under Castorf's directorship and was chief dramaturge and deputy artistic director there until 1998. In 2002, he was programme director of the Theater der Welt festival in the Rhineland. He is also the initiator of the now internationally performed project .

2003–2014: Berlin, Beirut, Mannheim 
In September 2003, Lilienthal became artistic director and managing director of the Hebbel am Ufer (HAU) in Berlin. In August 2010, he announced that he would not extend his contract beyond 2012. Instead, he worked with young artists in Beirut for ten months from autumn 2012. The jurors of the magazine Theater heute chose Hebbel am Ufer under Lilienthal's direction as the 2012 .  In 2014, he directed the international Theater der Welt festival in Mannheim.

2015–2020: Munich 
Since the 2015/2016 season, Lilienthal has been artistic director of the Munich Kammerspiele, succeeding Johan Simons.

Already before the start of the season, Lilienthal called for a worldwide tender for the art action Shabbyshabby Apartments: For four weeks in autumn 2015, 24 temporary huts and cottages stood in central locations in the city, preferably in places that stand for high rents such as Maximilianstraße. These accommodations could each be rented for 35 euros per person per night including breakfast in the theatre canteen in 2015. The project was intended to draw attention to Munich's high rental prices. With Foerster-Baldenius, Lilienthal had already carried out a very similar project entitled Hotel Shabbyshabby at the Nationaltheater Mannheim in 2014.

In March 2018, it was announced that Lilienthal would not seek an extension for his contract at the Kammerspiele, which ran until 2020. In summer 2019, however, critics named the Kammerspiele Theatre of the Year, 's Dionysos Stadt was best production, and other prizes were awarded for acting, stage design and young actors. The Berliner Theatertreffen invited productions of the Kammerspiele.

To mark the farewell of Lilienthal's directorship, the Olympiastadion in Munich was staged because of Corona. The Japanese director Toshiki Okada staged the Opening Ceremony, a one-hour performance with the Kammerspiele ensemble. The premiere on 11 July 2020 was "a spun-poetic piece" that alluded to this summer's Olympic Games in Japan, which were cancelled due to Corona, which most theatre critics from FAZ to Süddeutsche Zeitung to taz reviewed predominantly favourably.

Influences and theatre conception 
Lilienthal described as his most impressive theatre experience the production Winterreise im Olympiastadion by Klaus Michael Grüber, which he saw in Berlin in 1977, "300 spectators shivering in the Olympic Stadium at minus 20 degrees". When asked about important teachers, Lilienthal named Frank Castorf, Christoph Marthaler, Frank Baumbauer, Wilfried Schulz and his friendship with Christoph Schlingensief.

Lilienthal does not see theatre as an elitist space, but as a place for reflection and encounter that takes up the themes of a city and plays them back into the streets, as a "laboratory for trying out urban living space"

Membership 
Lilienthal has been a member of the Academy of Arts, Berlin since 1999.

References

Further reading 
 Dirk Baecker, Matthias Lilienthal, Tobi Müller: Hoffnung auf Ereignishaftes in der Erwartungserfüllungsanstalt. Der Soziologe Dirk Baecker, HAU-Chef Matthias Lilienthal und der Journalist Tobi Müller über die Performance als Vergrößerungsglas für den unsinnigen Ablauf von Hauptversammlungen und den Schritt von der Ostpolemik in den Neunzigern zu einer Umwidmung des Globalisierungsbegriffs. In Kirstin Hehmeyer, Matthias Pees (ed.): Import Export. Arbeitsbuch zum HAU Berlin. Theater der Zeit, Berlin 2012, .
 Gabriela Herpel: Der Mann aus Reihe drei. Im Herbst tritt Matthias Lilienthal als neuer Intendant der Münchner Kammerspiele an. Viele glauben, er werde das ehrwürdige Theater gehörig aufwirbeln. Dabei tut er das längst. In Süddeutsche Zeitung Magazin. Nr. 9, 27 February 2015, .
 Matthias Lilienthal, Philippe Quesne, Guido Graf, Tobi Müller: Gratiskoks für alle. Matthias Lilienthal, Philippe Quesne und Guido Graf im Gespräch mit Tobi Müller über den 24-Stunden-Marathon‚ Unendlicher Spaß‘. In Kirstin Hehmeyer, Matthias Pees (ed.): Import Export. Arbeitsbuch zum HAU Berlin. Theater der Zeit, Berlin 2012, .

External links 

 
 
 Tabellarische Biografie at the Academy of Arts, Berlin
 Rüdiger Schaper: Reinhauen, draufhauen, abhauen. Matthias Lilienthal gibt das Hebbel am Ufer ab. In Der Tagesspiegel, 20 August 2010

German theatre directors
Dramaturges
Members of the Academy of Arts, Berlin
1959 births
Living people
People from Berlin